Masterton-Dusenberry House is a historic home located at Bronxville, Westchester County, New York. It was built in the 1830s in an eclectic Greek Revival style.  It was built as a summer home for locally prominent stonemason Alexander Masterton. It is a two-story, wood-frame residence on a stone foundation with a clapboard exterior and gable roof.  It features a one-story, three bay wood front porch with an elaborate Doric order entablature, fluted columns, and a delicate railing.  It also features a roofline balustrade.  An addition was completed in the 1920s.

It was added to the National Register of Historic Places in 1980.

See also
National Register of Historic Places listings in southern Westchester County, New York

References

Bronxville, New York
Houses on the National Register of Historic Places in New York (state)
Greek Revival houses in New York (state)
Houses completed in 1830
Houses in Westchester County, New York
1830 establishments in New York (state)
National Register of Historic Places in Westchester County, New York